The 1977 Louisville Cardinals football team was an American football team that represented the University of Louisville as an independent during the 1977 NCAA Division I football season. In their third season under head coach Vince Gibson, the Cardinals compiled a 7–4–1 record and outscored opponents by a total of 291 to 194.

The team's statistical leaders included Stu Stram with 455 passing yards, Calvin Prince with 1,050 rushing yards and 78 points scored, and Marc Mitchell with 358 receiving yards.

Schedule

References

Louisville
Louisville Cardinals football seasons
Louisville Cardinals football